Ballerina is a 1932 novel by the British writer Eleanor Smith. It portrays the life of a great ballerina, and her eventual fall.

Adaptation 
It was adapted into the 1941 Hollywood film The Men in Her Life directed by Gregory Ratoff and starring Loretta Young and Conrad Veidt.

References

Bibliography
 Goble, Alan. The Complete Index to Literary Sources in Film. Walter de Gruyter, 1999.
 Vinson, James. Twentieth-Century Romance and Gothic Writers. Macmillan, 1982.

1932 British novels
Novels by Lady Eleanor Smith
British novels adapted into films
Victor Gollancz Ltd books
Books about ballet
Bobbs-Merrill Company books